Brădești is a commune in Harghita County, Romania. It lies in the Székely Land, an ethno-cultural region in eastern Transylvania. The commune is composed of two villages: Brădești and Târnovița (Küküllőkeményfalva).

History 
Until the reorganization of the system of the local administration of Transylvania in 1876, the village belonged to the Udvarhelyszék, afterwards to Udvarhely County in the Kingdom of Hungary. In the immediate aftermath of World War I, during the Hungarian–Romanian War (1918–1919), the area passed under Romanian administration. By the terms of the Treaty of Trianon of 1920, it became part of the Kingdom of Romania.

Demographics
At the 2011 census, the commune had a population of 1,915; out of them, 1,871 (97.7%) were Hungarian, 20 (1.0%) were Romanian and 3 (0.2%) were Roma. 83% of the commune population are Roman Catholic, 10% are Reformed, 4% are Unitarian and 1% are Orthodox.

References

Communes in Harghita County
Localities in Transylvania
Székely communities